Coeloptychium is an extinct genus of lychniscosidan hexasterophoran sea sponge which has often been used as an index fossil. Its remains have been found in Cretaceous sediments in Germany, Belgium, France and the UK. Coeloptyhcium is best preserved in Campanian sediments in Germany. The type species, C. agaricoides, was named in 1826.

Species
Coeloptychium agaricoides Goldfuss, 1826
Coeloptychium deciminum Roemer, 1841
Coeloptychium incisum Roemer, 1841
Coeloptychium princeps Roemer, 1861
Coeloptychium rude Zittel, 1876
Coeloptychium seebachi Zittel, 1876
Coeloptychium subagaricoides Sinov, 1871
Coeloptychium sulciferum Roemer, 1841

References 

Fossil taxa described in 1826
Sponge genera
Hexactinellida